The Bolshoy Salym is a river in Khanty-Mansi Autonomous Okrug, Russia. It is a left tributary of the Ob.

References

Rivers of Khanty-Mansi Autonomous Okrug